Mary Anne Schweitzer (born March 15, 1961) is an American sports shooter. She competed in the women's 10 metre air rifle event at the 1984 Summer Olympics.

References

1961 births
Living people
American female sport shooters
Olympic shooters of the United States
Shooters at the 1984 Summer Olympics
Sportspeople from Lancaster, Pennsylvania
20th-century American women